Stigmella rudis is a moth of the family Nepticulidae. It was described by Puplesis and Robinson in 2000, and is known from Argentina.

External links
Nepticulidae and Opostegidae of the world

Nepticulidae
Moths of South America
Moths described in 2000